George Lothian Hall (April 1825 – July 1888) was known as a water colour artist. He has paintings in the Yale Center for British Art including 16 of Gibraltar. 

Hall died in Wales in July 1888.

References

1825 births
1888 deaths
British watercolourists
19th-century British painters